Tweedsmuir is a village and civil parish in Tweeddale, the Scottish Borders Council district, southeastern Scotland.

Geography
The village is set in a valley, with the rolling hills and burns on both sides, covering some fifty square miles. It incorporates settlements at Hearthstane, Cockiland, Menzion, and Oliver.

Tweedsmuir was in the historic former county of Peeblesshire.

Landmarks and features
Oliver Castle was one of the local strongholds, and later country estates, of the Clan Tweedie family.

The Parish Church of Tweedsmuir was built with Scottish red sandstone. There are notable Tweedie gravestones in the parish churchyard.

The Crook Inn is in the village, on the A701. It is one of many claimants to be the oldest inn in Scotland. It is where Robert Burns wrote "Willie Wastle's Wife".

Talla Reservoir
The Talla Reservoir is nearby. In 1894 the Edinburgh and District Water Trustees decided to build Talla as the new source of water for Edinburgh. The surface and the gradient of the main road were unsuitable for carting the quantities of material that would be needed for the new reservoir, so the Talla Railway was built from Broughton to Talla. While work on the railway and the reservoir was in progress, a large number of workmen lived in Tweedsmuir, dramatically increasing the population.

The valve-closing ceremony was held at Talla on 20 May 1905, and on 28 September, when the reservoir was about two-fifths full, there was an inaugural ceremony.  The large company was brought from Edinburgh in two special trains, which were hauled for the last stage of the journey, from Broughton Station, by small service engines on the Talla railway.

Fruid Reservoir is also nearby.

See also
Baron Tweedsmuir
List of places in the Scottish Borders

References
  
 Scott, Sheila: Tales of Tweedsmuir: glimpses of an Upland Parish in the Past; Biggar, 1995.
Borders Family History Society: article on Tweedsmuir

Villages in the Scottish Borders
Peeblesshire
Tweeddale
Parishes in Peeblesshire